Unvollendete is German for "Unfinished" and may refer to:

 Symphony No. 8 in B minor by Franz Schubert
 Symphony No. 10 by Gustav Mahler
 Symphony No. 10 in E-Flat major by Ludwig van Beethoven